Adila (and its variant Adela) (Arabic: حمود) is a feminine given name and a surname. Its given name form is a feminine derivative of the name Adil meaning "just and fair". People with the name include:

Given name
 Adela Humood Alaboudi (born 1967), Iraqi politician
 Adila Bayhum (1900–1975), Syrian feminist and political activist
 Adila Fachiri (1886–1962), Hungarian violinist
 Adila Khanum (1879–1929), spouse of Hussein bin Ali, King of Hejaz
 Adila Mutallibova (1938–2019), Azerbaijani physician
 Adila bint Abdullah Al Saud, Saudi royal
 Adila Sedraïa (born 1984), known by her stage name Indila, French singer and songwriter
 Adila Shakhtakhtinskaya (1894–1951), Azerbaijani Soviet physician

Surname
 Ayoub Adila (born 1996), Moroccan football player

See also
 Adila, disambiguation page
 Adile, Turkish version of the name

References

Arabic feminine given names
Azerbaijani feminine given names
Hungarian feminine given names
Arabic-language surnames
Surnames from given names